Luton Hoo is an English country house and estate near Luton in Bedfordshire and Harpenden in Hertfordshire. Most of the estate lies within the civil parish of Hyde, Bedfordshire. The Saxon word Hoo means the spur of a hill, and is more commonly associated with East Anglia.

History

Pre-1762
The manor of Luton Hoo is not mentioned in the Domesday Book, but a family called de Hoo occupied a manor house on the site for four centuries, until the death of Thomas Hoo, 1st Baron Hoo and Hastings in 1455. The manor passed from the de Hoo family to the Rotherham family and then the Napier family. Successive houses were built on the site. In 1751, Francis Herne, a Member of Parliament MP for Bedford, inherited the house from his kinswoman Miss Napier.

Crichton-Stuart
In 1763 Francis Herne sold the estate for £94,700 to John Stuart, 3rd Earl of Bute.  Following an unhappy period as Prime Minister from 1762 to 1763, Bute decided to concentrate his energies on his estate at Luton Hoo.

The present house was built by the 3rd Earl of Bute to the designs of the neoclassical architect Robert Adam. Work commenced in 1767. The original plan had been for a grand and magnificent new house, but the plan was never fully executed and much of the work was a remodelling of the older house. Building work was interrupted by a fire in 1771 but by 1774 the house, though incomplete, was inhabited. Dr. Samuel Johnson, who visited the house in 1781, remarked: "This is one of the places I do not regret coming to see... in the house magnificence is not sacrificed to convenience, nor convenience to magnificence".

Luton Hoo was one of the largest houses for which Adam was wholly responsible. In the early 20th century, part of the park overlooked by the south-west facade of the house was transformed into formal gardens.

In about 1830, John Crichton-Stuart, 2nd Marquess of Bute, grandson of the 3rd Earl, transformed the house, to the designs of the architect Robert Smirke (later Sir Robert, 1781–1867), a leading architect of the era. Smirke redesigned the house (with the exception of the south front) to resemble its present form today, complete with a massive portico, similar to that designed by Adam but never built. His early work and domestic designs, such as that at Eastnor Castle, were often in a medieval style; he seems to have reserved his Greek revival style for public buildings such as the British Museum. Luton Hoo, neither gothic nor strictly Greek revival, is an unusual example of him using a classical style for domestic use, which perhaps he felt would be sympathetic to Adam's original conception.

Another addition was the neo-Gothic lodge with Tudor-style windows, and a Norman-style door, imported from an older building. Known as 'Lady Bute's Lodge' it is a Grade II listed building.

In 1843, a devastating fire destroyed much of the house and its contents. The house remained a burnt-out shell until after 1848, when the estate was sold to John Shaw Leigh.

Leigh
[[File:Lutonhoo1855.JPG|thumb|1855 engraving entitled: Luton Hoo, the seat of John Shaw Leigh, Esqre.]]

In 1848, the estate with the burnt-out house was purchased by John Shaw Leigh (d.1871), a Liverpool solicitor and property speculator, Mayor of Liverpool in 1841, whose family originated in Lipton, in Lancashire. He married Hannah Blundell-Hollinshead, a daughter of Henry Blundell (1755–1832), Mayor of Liverpool in 1791–1794 and in 1807, owner of Orrell, Blackrod and Pemberton collieries near Liverpool. His father, John Leigh, senior, was a solicitor and land agent to the Earl of Derby, the major landowner in the Liverpool area, but he also purchased much land in the area for himself on credit. John Leigh was the local agent of the Tory politician Bamber Gascoyne (1758–1824) and secretary of the "True Blue Club", a Tory political club formed in 1818, to support his election organisation. With the coming of the railways to Liverpool in the 1840s, the value of his holdings increased dramatically. It was remarked of John Leigh, Senior: 
"That he had a keen foresight beyond most of his contemporaries into the coming greatness of Liverpool there can be no doubt, but the actuality far exceeded his most sanguine expectations. The railway demands formed an element altogether outside of his calculations however shrewd...The Leighs carried a flair for the timely and well sited purchases of property to a remarkably high degree. And although no doubt their dealings with the railway companies on behalf of the great landowners they represented gave them both an unusual measure of inside information and a degree of monopoly control as vendors of land, the skill with which they made capital from these assets in the early railway age is unusual".

Leigh rebuilt the derelict shell in the style and manner of Smirke, rather than to Adam's earlier plan. In about 1863 "there was found a hoard of Roman coins near Luton, on the estate of John Shaw Leigh, Esq., of Luton Hoo. The coins, which must have been nearly a thousand in number, had been deposited in an imperfectly burnt urn composed of clay and pounded shell and consisted of denarii and small brass, ranging from the time of Caracalla to that of Claudius Gothicus". In 1871 the estate was inherited by his son John Gerard Leigh (1821–1875), who in 1872 married Eleanor Louisa Hawkes (d.1899), a daughter of Thomas Hawkes and widow of Hon. Humble Dudley Ward (1821–1870), a son of William Humble Ward, 10th Baron Ward of Birmingham. She was a close friend of the Prince of Wales. John Gerard Leigh died in 1875, only three years after his marriage, childless. He left his money to his wife Eleanor, together with a life-interest in Luton Hoo, with the remainder to his nephew Henry Leigh.

In 1883 Eleanor remarried to Christian Frederick de Falbe (1828–1896), the Danish ambassador to the United Kingdom, thus becoming known as "Madame de Falbe". She entertained lavishly and during her tenure Luton Hoo began an association with the British royal family. It was in December of 1891 that Prince Albert Victor, Duke of Clarence and Avondale, grandson of Queen Victoria, and second in line of the British throne, proposed to his fiancée, Princess Mary of Teck, at Luton Hoo. Madame de Falbe died in 1899 when the estate reverted to her second husband's nephew, Captain Henry Gerard Leigh (1856–1900), 1st Life Guards, who in 1886 had married Marion Lindsay Antrobus, a daughter of Hugh Lindsay Antrobus. He died one year after having inherited Luton Hoo, leaving an 11-year-old son Lt-Col. John Cecil Gerard Leigh (1889–1963), on whose behalf in 1903 Luton Hoo was sold to Sir Julius Wernher, the diamond magnate, who had rented it since 1899. John Leigh later lived at  Thorp Satchville Hall, Melton Mowbray, Leicestershire.

Wernher
In 1903 the house was bought by Sir Julius Wernher, who had made his fortune from the diamond mines of South Africa. Wernher remodelled the interior to the designs of Charles Mewes and Arthur Joseph Davis, the architects of the Ritz Hotel in London. It was at this time that the mansard roof was added, to increase the amount of staff accommodation. This alteration, coupled with the newly installed casement windows was in the Second Empire style of architecture.

The lavish redesigning of the interior in the belle epoque style resulted in a magnificent backdrop for Wernher's famous art collection. The marble-walled dining room was designed to display Beauvais tapestries, while the newly installed curving marble staircase enveloped Bergonzoli's statue "The Love of Angels".  At the centre of the house the massive Blue Hall displayed further tapestries, Louis XV furniture, and Sèvres porcelain. Sir Julius Wernher's widow, later Lady Ludlow, added her collection of English porcelain to the treasures of the house.

The Wernhers' great art collection, equal to that of the Rothschilds, their near neighbours at Waddesdon Manor
in Buckinghamshire, was later further enhanced by the marriage of Harold Augustus Wernher, the son of Julius Wernher, to Anastasia de Torby, the morganatic daughter of a member of the former Russian Imperial family, generally known as "Lady Zia". She brought to the collection an incomparable assembly of Renaissance enamels and Russian artefacts, including works by Peter Carl Fabergé, the Russian Imperial court jeweller. Many of the Fabergé items were stolen in the 1990s. For many years, the collection and the house were open to the public, with the house having undergone a major and hugely successful rejuvenation under the direction of Mrs Lucy Phillips, Lady Zia's granddaughter-in-law, that brought back to life the Russian Chapel and opened up new areas of the house whilst also showcasing more of the Wernher collection.

During World War II the Wernher family allowed the house to serve as Headquarters Eastern Command. Luton Hoo's estate was used as a tank testing ground for the Churchill tanks, which were produced in factories in the town of Luton.

The Wernhers, by virtue of Lady Zia's sister Nadejda de Torby, were very close to Prince Philip, who along with the Queen, were frequent visitors to Luton Hoo both for public events and private visits. The royal couple spent a number of wedding anniversaries staying at Luton Hoo.

Phillips
Following Lady Zia's death in 1977, the estate passed to her grandson Nicholas Harold Phillips, after whose death in 1991 the house and 1,059 acres were sold by his wife Lucy Phillips. The Phillips family, descendants of Sir Julius and Lady Alice Wernher, still retain ownership of a significant part of the historic estate running it successfully as a diversified business that is home to commercial and residential tenants as well as restoring the Walled Garden (see below) and one of the busiest non-studio filming locations in the country. Part of the collection, including works by Peter Paul Rubens, Titian and Bartolomé Bermejo, was also sold whilst a portion remains together and is now on permanent display at Ranger's House in Greenwich, London.

In 1997, the grounds were hired out for the Tribal Gathering dance music festival and again in 2005, but the latter event was cancelled due to the 7 July 2005 London bombings.

Hotel
The house was converted into a luxury hotel called the Luton Hoo Hotel, Golf, and Spa, which opened in October 2007. It has 228 bedrooms and suites. Part of the restoration project involved rebuilding the second floor of the house, which was included in the plans drawn up by the original architects. The owners, Elite Hotels, say that furnishings have been selected with the aim of restoring the house to its former glory. In December 2021 the hotel was sold to The Arora Group a UK based hotel & property company.

Walled Garden
Luton Hoo Estate also possesses a  octagonal walled garden which was established by John Stuart, 3rd Earl of Bute, in the late 1760s. Successive owners of the estate adapted the garden to match the changing fashions in gardens over the years. Numerous heated glasshouses were built by the Leigh family in the last quarter of the 19th century for the production of fruit and flowers. The largest of the glasshouses, built by the firm of Mackenzie and Moncur for Sir Julius and Lady Alice Wernher, is evidence of the extravagance of the Edwardian period. The Walled Garden underwent extensive restoration for 2001-2021, with the help of over 100 volunteers, and is open to visitors and tours every Wednesday from May to October.

Film location
Luton Hoo has appeared in many films including A Shot in the Dark, Never Say Never Again, Four Weddings and a Funeral, Eyes Wide Shut, The Secret Garden, Princess Caraboo, Wilde, The World Is Not Enough, Quills, Enigma, De-Lovely and Bright Young Things. More recently the historic farm buildings were used as a location for the John Landis film Burke & Hare, and stood in for Bleeding Heart Yard in the BBC TV series Little Dorrit using sets designed originally for the BBC's 2005 BAFTA award-winning Bleak House. On 13 and 14 October 2010, filming of the Steven Spielberg film War Horse took place at the Luton Hoo Estate. Luton Hoo stood in for Chequers, in the film Ali G Indahouse.
Luton Hoo was also used as a location in the 2020 Netflix film Enola Holmes. Both the 2017 Joss Whedon and 2021 Zack Snyder release of Justice League credit the Estate. Luton Hoo Estate is one of the busiest non-studio locations in the country.

References

 Raleigh Trevelyan. Grand Dukes and Diamonds: The Wernhers of Luton Hoo'' (Secker & Warburg, 1991)

External links

Website of the hotel
Website of the Luton Hoo Estate
Website of The Conservatory at the Luton Hoo Walled Garden

Country houses in Bedfordshire
Hotels in Bedfordshire
Second Empire architecture
Listed buildings in Luton
Grade I listed houses
Grade I listed buildings in Bedfordshire
Gardens by Capability Brown
Prime ministerial homes in the United Kingdom
Country house hotels
Golf clubs and courses in Bedfordshire